Wills Mountain is a quartzite-capped ridge in the Ridge and Valley physiographic province of the Appalachian Mountains in Pennsylvania and Maryland, United States, extending from near Bedford, Pennsylvania, to near Cumberland, Maryland.  It is the northernmost of several mountain ridges included within the Wills Mountain Anticline.

Geography

Pennsylvania
Although there are mountains in Pennsylvania's Appalachian Plateau that are higher, Wills Mountain is the highest in its Ridge and Valley physiographic province. Wills Mountain may have the highest prominence in Pennsylvania. The mountain ridge begins abruptly near the Juniata River just north of  Kinton Knob, west of Bedford, and just south of the Pennsylvania Turnpike. The valley to the south of Kinton Knob is known as Milligans Cove, an excellent geological example of a breached anticline.

Portions of Wills Mountain, including the summit, are located in Pennsylvania State Game Lands No. 48, where access to the mountain is limited, with only jeep trails and a gravel road on the ridge. The summit, like Martin Hill to the east, has no towers or transmitters.

Maryland

The Maryland part of Wills Mountain is located in Allegany County, where the mountain rises steeply from the Cumberland Narrows, a water gap west of Cumberland, half a mile (0.8 km) west of the mouth of Warrior Run.

Haystack Mountain is on the south side of the Narrows.  Geologically, the two mountains are equivalent, both being central ridges of the Wills Mountain Anticline.  The Cumberland Narrows was carved into these quartzite-capped mountain ridges by Wills Creek, a Potomac River tributary,  over millions of years.

The Cumberland Narrows serves as a western gateway from Cumberland to the Appalachian Plateau and the Ohio River Valley beyond.  The Old National Road, now Alternate U.S. 40, passes through the Narrows, along with the former Baltimore and Ohio Railroad's main line between Baltimore/Washington and Pittsburgh, now part of the CSX system, and a former line of the Western Maryland Railroad, now used by the steam- and diesel-powered excursion trains of the Western Maryland Scenic Railroad and the Great Allegheny Passage bike trail.

A prominent rocky outcropping at the south end of Wills Mountain in the Cumberland Narrows is known as Lover's Leap.

Geology

Wills Mountain is capped by the erosion-resistant Silurian Tuscarora quartzite.  The mountain stands in the center of the Wills Mountain Anticline, a geological structure that extends from southern Pennsylvania through Maryland and West Virginia into Virginia.  In this anticline, the Tuscarora and various other rock strata are bent upward, with the erosion-resistant Tuscarora capping the mountain's ridgetop, and more easily eroded Silurian limestones and shales on the mountain's slopes.

See also
 Wills Mountain State Park

References

 United States Geological Survey
 Maryland Geological Survey
 Alan R. Geyer (1979) "Outstanding Geologic Features of Pennsylvania", Pennsylvania Geological Survey
 Charles H. Shultz (1999) "The Geology of Pennsylvania", Pennsylvania Geological Survey

External links

 

Landforms of Allegany County, Maryland
Ridges of Maryland
Ridges of Pennsylvania
Allegheny Mountains
Ridges of Bedford County, Pennsylvania